Namiki Sōsuke (1695 – c. 1751), also known as Namiki Senryū, was a prominent Japanese playwright who wrote for both kabuki and bunraku (puppet theater). He produced around 47 bunraku plays,  nearly 40 of them composed for jōruri, a particular form of musical narrative, and 10 kabuki plays. He is considered the second greatest Japanese playwright after Chikamatsu Monzaemon.

Sōsuke was born in Osaka in 1695 and for the early part of his life he was a buddhist monk in the Jōjūji temple in Mihara, Bingo province. He then left priesthood and settled in Osaka to become a playwright, starting as a disciple of Nishizawa Icchū in the Toyotake-za theatre.

Collaborating with a number of other playwrights, including Takeda Izumo I and Miyoshi Shōraku, Namiki Sōsuke created some of the most famous traditional Japanese plays. Among them are Natsu Matsuri Naniwa Kagami (1745, Summer Festival: Mirror of Osaka), Sugawara denju tenarai kagami (1746, The Secrets of Sugawara's Calligraphy), Yoshitsune no senbonzakura (1747, The Thousand Cherry Blossoms of Yoshitsune), and Kanadehon chūshingura (1748, The Treasure of the Loyal Retainers). Namiki died while writing Ichinotani futaba gunki (1751, The Chronicle of the Battle of Ichi-no-Tani), but it was completed by some of his collaborators.

One of his plays has been translated into English, Summer Festival: Mirror of Osaka (1745, translated by Julie A. Iezzi) in Kabuki Plays on Stage I: Brilliance and Bravado, 1697–1770, edited by James R. Brandon and Samuel L. Leiter.

Plays
(The following list is only a selection of Namiki Sōsuke's most famous works.)

 Izutsuya Genroku Koi no Kanzarashi (1723) with others, bunraku
 Hōjō Jiraiki (1726) with Nishizawa Icchū, bunraku
 Karukaya Dōshin Tsukushi no Iezuto (1735) with Namiki Jōsuke, bunraku
 Wada Gassen Onna Maizuru (1736) bunraku
 Kama-ga-Fuchi Futatsu Domoe (1737) bunraku
 Hibariyama Himesute Matsu (1740) bunraku
 Futatsu Biki Nishiki no Manmaku (1743) with Namiki Eisuke I, kabuki
 Natsu Matsuri Naniwa Kagami (Summer Festival: Mirror of Osaka, 1745) with Miyoshi Shōraku and Takeda Koizumo I, bunraku. Adapted to kabuki the same year
 Sugawara Denju Tenarai Kagami (1746) with Takeda Izumo I, Miyoshi Shōraku and Takeda Koizumo I, bunraku. Adapted to kabuki the same year
 Yoshitsune Senbon Zakura (1747) with Takeda Izumo II and Miyoshi Shōraku, bunraku. Adapted to kabuki the next year
 Kanadehon Chūshingura (1748) with Takeda Izumo II and Miyoshi Shōraku, bunraku. Adapted to kabuki the same year
 Futatsu Chōchō Kuruwa Nikki (1749) with Takeda Izumo II and Miyoshi Shōraku, bunraku
 Genpei Nunobiki no Taki (1749) with Miyoshi Shōraku, bunraku
 Ichi-no-Tani Futaba Gunki (1751) with Asada Icchō, Namioka Geiji, Namiki Shōzō I, Naniwa Sanzō and Toyotake Jinroku, bunraku

Notes

References
 Takaya, Ted T. (1985). "Namiki Sōsuke." Kodansha Encyclopedia of Japan. Tokyo: Kodansha Ltd.
 Kabuki Plays on Stage I: Brilliance and Bravado, 1697–1770. (2002) University of Hawaii Press,  .
Mills, Jonathan Charles (2020). Namiki Sôsuke (1695-1751), dramaturge de l’« âge d'or » du théâtre ningyô-jôruri (Doctoral Thesis, fr). Inalco, Paris. URL: http://www.theses.fr/en/2020INAL0001

1695 births
1750s deaths
18th-century Buddhist monks
Japanese writers of the Edo period
Kabuki playwrights
Bunraku
Year of death unknown
18th-century Japanese dramatists and playwrights
18th-century Japanese people
Writers from Osaka